Gülşen Aktaş (born 1957) is a Turkish educator and social worker of Kurdish origin. Living in Schöneberg, Berlin, she serves for the needs of migrant women in Germany. She was awarded with "Kosmopolita" in 2009 and "Order of Merit of Berlin" in 2011.

Private life
Gülşen Aktaş was born in Tunceli, Eastern Anatolia Region of Turkey in 1957. She is of Kurdish Alevi origin. Her father died at an early age. Her mother moved without the children  to Germany to work as a Gastarbeiter. She worked for years in a factory to provide for her four daughters in Turkey. Gülşen Aktaş grew up with relatives and homes in Turkey. She graduated from high school in Şanlıurfa, and became a primary school teacher in Diyarbakır Province.

At the age of 21, Gülşen Aktaş followed her mother to Germany. First in Frankfurt am Main and later in Berlin, she completed a degree in political science.

Career
After graduating, she worked in one of the first women's shelters in Berlin, and worked in various immigrant and women's projects. In 2004, she supervised and advised pupils and parents of various origins at the Neumark primary school in Schöneberg, where she lives. She founded a women's network for Armenian, Turkish, Kurdish, Bosnian and Arab women, mothers and girls.

Since 2007, she has been managing the "Huzur", Turkish for peace, tranquility, for senior citizens, which is frequented by first-generation migrants. self-help potential is promoted in this institution, which realizes intercultural dialogue between different ethnic groups of all ages. Additionally, in the facility, integration through education and leisure activities are organized. Other offerings are literacy class, the choir, new project ideas, such as retreat Nordic walking in the Tiergarten or senior Karaoke. Excursions on the subject of "History of Germany" find great popularity.

Awards
For her extraordinary projects related to migrants of diverse ethnic groups, she was awarded the 2009 "Kosmopolita" Prize.

On 30 September 2011, the Governing Mayor of Berlin Klaus Wowereit awarded her the "Order of Merit of Berlin".

References

Living people
1957 births
People from Tunceli
Turkish expatriates in Germany
German people of Kurdish descent
Kurdish Alevis
Turkish schoolteachers
Turkish social workers
Recipients of the Order of Merit of Berlin